(formerly , and ) is a French art and music school based in Strasbourg, Alsace.

The façade was designed by Anton Seder (himself a former pupil, at a previous  building) and executed by Léon Elchinger, one of his first students.

Former academics and alumni 

The following artists have taught or been taught at the HEAR:
Hans/Jean Arp
René Beeh
François-Rupert Carabin
Joseph Ehrismann
Léon Hornecker
John Howe
Alfred Marzolff
Joseph Sattler
Léo Schnug
Tomi Ungerer

References

External links
 

Art schools in France
Culture in Strasbourg
Universities and colleges in Strasbourg
Education in Strasbourg